Deepa Bhatia is a Bollywood film editor, producer and director based in Mumbai. She is known for editing commercially successful films like Tare Zameen Par, My Name is Khan, Rock On, Kai Po Che, Student of the Year and Raees. She has recently edited films like Kedarnath, Drive and the much talked about biopic on Sachin Tendulkar, Sachin: A Billion Dreams.

Deepa believes that editing is making something the best it can be. In her own words, "A movie is written thrice. Once, when it is written, the second, when it is directed, and the third, when it is edited. It is unfortunate that editors don't get their due. It frustrates me when people think cutting is editing."

In 2010, UTV World Movies chose her as the personality of the month to pick four movies of her choice from the channel's collection. The movies she picked were Machuca, Cousin Cousine, Twin Sisters and 8 Women.

Career 
Deepa started her career by assisting directors before venturing into full-time into post-production. She has over 20 years of experience as an editor and has worked with directors like Govind Nihalani (Dev, Hazaar Chaurasi Ki Maa, Deham) and Jahnu Barua (Maine Gandhi Ko Nahi Mara, Har Pall). Her editing work on films like Kai Po Che and Rock On has been one of her most noteworthy projects and has bagged her awards like the Star Screen Awards.

Apart from her career as a film editor in Bollywood, she has also directed and produced a critically acclaimed documentary titled Nero’s Guests: The Age of Inequality about farmer suicides in Maharashtra. The documentary won two awards at Mumbai International Film Festival (MIFF). It took Deepa 5 years to direct and a year to edit this challenging documentary.

Personal life 
Deepa is married to screenwriter, Amole Gupte and they have a son Partho Gupte. She is an alumna of Sophia Polytechnic.

Filmography

Editor

Director
 Nero's Guests: The Age of Inequality (Documentary)

Awards
Star Screen Awards
 Won: Best Editing – Rock On!!
 Won: John Abraham National Award for Best Documentary in SIGNS 2011 – Nero's Guests
 Won: Best Editing – Kai Po Che!

References

External links
 Vij, Gauri. "" The Hindu, 3 February 2008.
 

Living people
Year of birth missing (living people)
Sophia Polytechnic alumni
Film editors from Maharashtra
Hindi film editors
Indian documentary film editors
Women artists from Maharashtra
Women documentary filmmakers
21st-century Indian women
21st-century Indian people
Indian women film editors
Indian women film directors
Indian women filmmakers
Indian women film producers